The nuchal lines are four curved lines on the external surface of the occipital bone:
 The upper, often faintly marked, is named the highest nuchal line, but is sometimes referred to as the Mempin line or linea suprema, and it attaches to the epicranial aponeurosis.
 Below the highest nuchal line is the superior nuchal line. To it is attached, the splenius capitis muscle, the trapezius muscle, and the occipitalis.
 From the external occipital protuberance a ridge or crest, the external occipital crest also called the median nuchal line, often faintly marked, descends to the foramen magnum, and affords attachment to the nuchal ligament.
 Running from the middle of this line is the inferior nuchal line. Attached are the obliquus capitis superior muscle, rectus capitis posterior major muscle, and rectus capitis posterior minor muscle.

Additional images

References

External links

 

Bones of the head and neck